Alexander Rogers may refer to:
 Alexander Rogers (sport shooter)
 Alexander Rogers (Canadian politician)
 Alexander Rogers (Australian politician)

See also
 Alex Rogers (disambiguation)
 Rogers Alexander, American football player